James Whitall Jr. House is located in National Park, Gloucester County, New Jersey. The house was built in 1766 and was added to the National Register of Historic Places on February 6, 1973.

See also
National Register of Historic Places listings in Gloucester County, New Jersey

References

Houses on the National Register of Historic Places in New Jersey
Houses completed in 1766
Houses in Gloucester County, New Jersey
National Register of Historic Places in Gloucester County, New Jersey
National Park, New Jersey
New Jersey Register of Historic Places